Jamie Kallio (born 1 November 1965 in Sudbury, Ontario) is a Canadian former biathlete who competed in the 1988 Winter Olympics. He competed both in the Men's 20 kilometers race, where he scored rank 59, and the Men's 4 x 7.5 kilometers relay, where he finished rank 15.

References

1965 births
Living people
Canadian male biathletes
Olympic biathletes of Canada
Biathletes at the 1988 Winter Olympics